Stacy Tutt (born August 8, 1982) is a former American football fullback. He was originally signed by the Jets as an undrafted free agent in 2006. He played college football at Richmond.

Early years
Tutt attended high school at Essex High School in Tappahannock, Virginia.

College career
Tutt was a quarterback at the University of Richmond, where he ranks second all-time in career total offense, third in career passing yards, and fourth in career touchdown passes.

Professional career
Initially signed to the Jets' practice squad, Tutt was added to the active roster in 2007 and saw action in the first nine games of the season before suffering a season-ending knee injury. Tutt was re-signed by the Jets to an exclusive-rights contract on February 29, 2008.

On April 28, 2008, Tutt was released by the Jets.

Coaching career
Tutt was named running backs coach at his alma mater, the University of Richmond, in February 2009 and served in that capacity for two seasons before stepping down.

References

External links
New York Jets bio
Richmond Spiders bio

1982 births
Living people
Sportspeople from Fredericksburg, Virginia
American football quarterbacks
American football running backs
Richmond Spiders football coaches
Richmond Spiders football players
New York Jets players